Agathe Rousselle (born 14 June 1988) is a French journalist, model, and actress. She is the co-founder of feminist magazine Peach and a custom embroidery company Cheeky Boom. She is also known for her lead performance as Alexia in the body horror film Titane, which won the Palme d'Or at the 2021 Cannes Film Festival.

Career

Journalism career
Rousselle began her career as a journalist and editor. In 2016, she participated in the creation of General Pop, a cultural web magazine dedicated to emerging cultures. The same year, she co-founded the feminist magazine Peach with the actress and singer Tifenn-Tiana Fournereau. This magazine, created by women, highlights female artists and creators, in reaction to the lack of exclusively female artistic collectives in France. The review was launched on 22 September at the TDTF3 bar in Paris. The magazine wishes to set itself apart from the traditional women's press while targeting both a female and male audience. It also advocates inclusiveness, appealing for its realization to trans and non-binary people who are often marginalized in the professional world.

Fashion and entrepreneurship

Passionate about embroidery, which she practices as a hobby, Rousselle created the company Cheeky Boom in 2012 with her boyfriend at the time, Jean André de Trémontels, a freelance graphic designer. Cheeky Boom sells T-shirts and panties that are embellished with designed embroidery. In 2015, Rousselle became captain of a running team called Boost Pigalle, sponsored by sports equipment manufacturer Adidas. She is also a photographer and model.

Acting career
Rousselle took drama class from age 15 to age 22. She began her acting career with minor roles and short appearances in feature films. In 2015, she played the leading role in 5 vagues de l'avenir, a short film by Laurent Perreau. In 2021, she made her feature film debut in the lead role of Alexia in Titane, directed by Julia Ducournau. Rousselle plays Alexia, a serial killer who has an unusual sexual desire for cars. Following the film's premiere at the Cannes Film Festival, where it won the Palme d'Or, The New York Times called the film "one of the weirdest prizewinners of the year".

Rousselle will perform the role of Blake in Oliver Leith's opera Last Days, adapted from the Gus Van Sant film of the same name, at the Royal Opera House.

Filmography

Film

Awards and nominations

References

External links
 

1988 births
21st-century French actresses
French film actresses
21st-century French businesswomen
21st-century French businesspeople
Living people